Karpacz  (German: Krummhübel) is a spa town and ski resort in Jelenia Góra County, Lower Silesian Voivodeship, south-western Poland, and one of the most important centres for mountain hiking and skiing, including ski jumping. Its population is about 4,500. Karpacz is situated in the Karkonosze Mountains – a resort with increasing importance for tourism as an alternative to the Alps.

South of Karpacz on the border to the Czech Republic there is Mount Sněžka-Śnieżka. Since 2020, the town has been hosting the annual international Economic Forum.

History

The first settlements in the area of Karpacz are noted by the official website of the city as being of probable Celtic origin and date to the 4th or 3rd century BC when they inhabited the region as part of gold-digging taking place in the area. The area was part of medieval Poland, after the establishment of the state in the 10th century. In the early 12th century the area was generally uninhabited, as mentioned in the oldest Polish chronicle Gesta principum Polonorum. The first mention of permanent location within the current boundaries of the town is dated to the beginning of 15th century and connected to the destruction of a village called Broniów, whose inhabitants moved to settle the area currently located at the altitude of the town's railway station.

The settlement was mentioned around the year 1599 because of lead and iron mining in the region. It was then part of the Habsburg-ruled Bohemian Crown. During the Thirty Years' War, many Czech Protestants settled at the site of today's town.

In 1742 it was annexed by Prussia and, subsequently, it was part of Germany between 1871 and 1945. Since the construction of the settlement's first railway connection in 1895, its history was connected with the development of metallurgy industries and with the progress of tourism. After the defeat of Nazi Germany in World War II, in 1945 it became again part of Poland. In accordance with the Potsdam Agreement, the German population was expelled from the village between 1945 and 1947. The town was subsequently repopulated with Poles, who in turn were expelled from former eastern Poland annexed by the Soviet Union, and eventually renamed Karpacz in 1946. It was granted town rights in 1959.

Tourist attractions
In Karpacz Górny a gravity hill is located where bottles appear to roll uphill. There is also a Norwegian stave church, moved here from Vang, Norway in the mid-19th century. Tourists very often choose to go hiking on local mountain trails.

People 
 Max von Schenckendorff (1875-1943), German general in the Wehrmacht of Nazi Germany

Twin towns – sister cities

Karpacz is twinned with:

 Kamenz, Germany
 Pec pod Sněžkou, Czech Republic
 Reichenbach, Germany
 Rewal, Poland

Gallery

References

External links

  
 Karpacz and wirtual Map 
 Karpacz 360 - virtual city 
 Karpacz - Krummhübel, Karbacz, Krzywa Góra (1945 r.), Drogosławice (1946 r.) na portalu polska-org.pl 
 Karpacz- Gallery 

Cities and towns in Lower Silesian Voivodeship
Karkonosze County
Ski areas and resorts in Poland
Cities in Silesia